Michael Lecky (born 12 November 1952) is a Jamaican former cyclist. He competed in three events at the 1972 Summer Olympics. He currently resides in Canada and operates a managing general agency, Alliance Financial Group, founded in 1982.

References

External links
 

1952 births
Living people
Jamaican male cyclists
Olympic cyclists of Jamaica
Cyclists at the 1972 Summer Olympics
Place of birth missing (living people)